The Forest Park Boulevard Historic District is a national historic district located at Fort Wayne, Indiana.  The district encompasses 93 contributing buildings, 1 contributing site, and 15 contributing objects in a predominantly residential section of Fort Wayne. The area was developed from about 1890 to 1955, and includes notable examples of Colonial Revival and Tudor Revival style architecture. The district features ornamental light posts / streetlights and stone entry markers.

It was listed on the National Register of Historic Places in 2007.

References

Historic districts on the National Register of Historic Places in Indiana
Colonial Revival architecture in Indiana
Tudor Revival architecture in Indiana
National Register of Historic Places in Fort Wayne, Indiana
Populated places established in 1910